Lossa is a river of Saxony-Anhalt and Thuringia, Germany. It flows into the Unstrut in Leubingen.

See also
List of rivers of Saxony-Anhalt
List of rivers of Thuringia

Rivers of Saxony-Anhalt
Rivers of Thuringia
Rivers of Germany